Shashikant Dhotre (born April 1, 1982) is an Indian artist.

Early life
Shashikant Dhotre was born in Shirapur village, India. Dhotre joined Bachelor of Fine Arts in painting in Sir Jamsetjee Jeejebhoy School of Art, Mumbai in year 2003. He had to leave the college halfway due to financial constraints. Since then, he started his professional work and developed an expertise in colour pencil and pastel on paper.

Awards
2007 – Arts Society of India
2009 – First prize at Bombay Arts Society Awards
2010 – Aashadeep Award, Maharashtra
2011 – First prize at India Art Festival Awards
2013 – First prize at State Art Exhibition Awards
2015 – Kohinoor of Maharashtra Awards
2016 – Maharashtrian of the Year Awards

Exhibition

He participated in  11 selected group exhibition 
And more than 10 solo exhibition
'Jaagar' was the Travelling show, a journey of Art exhibition in famous cities of Maharashtra.

References

Living people
1982 births
People from Ahmednagar district
21st-century Indian male artists
21st-century Indian painters